La Petite Mort or a Conversation with God is the second studio album by American heavy metal band King 810. It was released on September 16, 2016 via Roadrunner Records.

Track listing

Personnel 
King 810
 David Gunn – vocals
 Andrew Beal – guitars
 Eugene Gill – bass
 Andrew Workman – drums
Additional musicians
 Christian Mathis – vocals 
 Reba Meyers – vocals 
 Joseph Bongiorno – string arrangements, orchestration 
 Sammy "Bananas" Posner – alto saxophone 
 JC Kuhl – tenor saxophone 
 Kaylee Oczpek – vocals 
 Delphine Montassier – vocals 
Production
 King 810, Josh Schroeder – production, mixing
 David Gunn – lyrics
 Justyn Pilbrow – production 
 Dave Kutch – mastering

Chart history

References

External links

2016 albums
King 810 albums
Roadrunner Records albums